Dectes is a genus of longhorn beetles of the subfamily Lamiinae. It was described by John Lawrence LeConte in 1852.

Species
 Dectes nigripilus Chemsak & Linsley, 1986
 Dectes sayi Dillon and Dillon, 1953
 Dectes texanus LeConte, 1862

References

Acanthocinini